Alexander Terentiev (born January 1, 1961, Urgench, Xorazm Region) is a Russian political figure and a deputy of the 5th, 6th, 7th, and 8th State Dumas.
 
In 1982, Terentiev moved to Tyumen Oblast where he worked at the Surgut management of technological transport and at the enterprises of Noyabrsk. During the second half of the 1990s-beginning of the 2000s, Terentived worked at several industrial enterprises, including Noyabrskneftegaz, Naftasib, P.F.K. - Dom LLC. In 2006, he joined the A Just Russia — For Truth. On December 2, 2007, he was elected deputy of the 5th State Duma from the Altai Krai constituency. In 2011, 2016, and 2021, he was re-elected for the 6th, 7th, and 8th State Dumas.

References
 

 

1961 births
Living people
A Just Russia politicians
21st-century Russian politicians
Eighth convocation members of the State Duma (Russian Federation)
Seventh convocation members of the State Duma (Russian Federation)
Sixth convocation members of the State Duma (Russian Federation)
Fifth convocation members of the State Duma (Russian Federation)
People from Pavlodar Region